David Walker (born August 1, 1947) is a Canadian politician.  He served in the House of Commons of Canada from 1988 to 1997, as a member of the Liberal Party.

Walker was born in Sudbury, Ontario.  He holds a Bachelor of Arts degree from Carleton University (1970), a Master of Arts from Queen's University (1974), and a Ph.D. from McMaster University (1976).  He was a professor of Political Science at the University of Winnipeg in Manitoba from 1974 to 1988, and was also an adjunct professor at the University of Manitoba from 1977 to 1988.  Walker was a partner in Walker-Zimmerman Consultants from 1978 to 1985, and served as president of West-Can Consultants Ltd. from 1978 to 1993.  From 1985 to 1987, he was research director for the Angus Reid polling firm.

He campaigned for the Legislative Assembly of Manitoba in the 1977 provincial election, but finished second against former Progressive Conservative leader Sidney Spivak in the upscale constituency of River Heights.  Walker worked as campaign manager to Liberal candidate Lloyd Axworthy in the 1979 and 1984 federal elections (Globe and Mail, 30 April 1979 and 24 August 1984), and worked as an adviser to Axworthy on Via Rail issues in the early 1980s (Globe and Mail, 10 January 1985).

Books

Walker is the author of "Great Winnipeg Dream" (1979), and the co-author of "Livable Winter Cities" (1986), "Living Within our Means: The Role of Voluntary Associations" (1986) and "Canadian Municipalities and Conditions of Fiscal Austerity in International Perspective" (1987)and most recently his first novel "Wild World".  He chaired a Task Force of Native Employment in Manitoba in 1980, and a Via Rail task force in 1983-84.

He was elected to the Canadian House of Commons in the 1988 federal election, defeating New Democratic Party incumbent Cyril Keeper in Winnipeg North Centre.  Walker was the first Liberal candidate ever to win this riding, following sixty-seven years of representation by democratic socialist parties.  The Progressive Conservative Party won a majority government in this election, and Walker served for the next five years as a member of the Official Opposition.

Walker was the co-leader of Paul Martin's bid to become Liberal Party leader in 1990 (Toronto Star, 3 June 1990).  He also worked campaign manager for the Manitoba Liberal Party in the 1990 provincial election (Globe and Mail, 12 September 1990).

The Liberals won a majority government in the 1993 election, and Walker was re-elected with a convincing victory over former provincial cabinet minister Maureen Hemphill.  He served as parliamentary secretary to Finance Minister Paul Martin from 1993 to 1996, when he was promoted to become chairman of the standing committee on industry (Winnipeg Free Press, 5 March 1996).  He was defeated in the 1997 election, narrowly losing to NDP candidate Pat Martin.

Walker returned to his consulting business after leaving the House of Commons (Globe and Mail, 20 March 1999).  He also worked on Paul Martin's second leadership bid in the early 2000s (National Post, 16 July 2001).

In 2000, he was appointed as chief federal negotiator for a Framework Agreement Initiative with the Assembly of Manitoba Chiefs concerning issues of aboriginal self-government.

Electoral history

References

External links
 

1947 births
Living people
Members of the House of Commons of Canada from Manitoba
Liberal Party of Canada MPs
Politicians from Greater Sudbury
Writers from Greater Sudbury
McMaster University alumni
Queen's University at Kingston alumni
Carleton University alumni
Canadian non-fiction writers
Canadian male novelists
Canadian male non-fiction writers